Sir Bruce Houlton Slane   (10 August 1931 – 7 January 2017) was a New Zealand public servant and lawyer. He served as New Zealand's first Privacy Commissioner from 1993 to 2003.
 
Slane was educated at Takapuna Grammar School and Auckland University, graduating with a law degree in 1957.
 
In the 1985 New Year Honours, Slane was named a Commander of the Order of the British Empire, in recognition of his service as president of the New Zealand Law Society. He was appointed a Distinguished Companion of the New Zealand Order of Merit, for services to personal and human rights and the law, in the 2003 New Year Honours. He accepted the redesignation as a Knight Companion of the New Zealand Order of Merit in 2009, following the reintroduction of titular honours by the New Zealand government.

Slane's wife, Penelope, Lady Slane, died on 28 December 2016. Sir Bruce died ten days later, on 7 January 2017.

References 

1931 births
2017 deaths
20th-century New Zealand lawyers
New Zealand public servants
People educated at Takapuna Grammar School
University of Auckland alumni
New Zealand Commanders of the Order of the British Empire
Knights Companion of the New Zealand Order of Merit